Jack Daniel (1849–1911) is the founder of the Jack Daniel's whisky distillery.

Jack Daniel may also refer to:

 Jack Daniel (cricketer) (1923–2002), an Australian cricketer
 Jack Daniel (DJ), an American radio DJ

See also
Jack Daniel's, a Tennessee Whiskey distillery 
Jack Daniels (disambiguation)
John Daniel (disambiguation)

Daniel, Jack